Zakharov, or Zakharova (feminine; Захарова) is a Russian surname. Notable people with the surname include:

People
Aleksandr Zakharov, multiple people
Alexander V. Zakharov (born 1941), Soviet and Russian scientist
Anastasia Zakharova (born 2002), Russian tennis player
Andreyan Zakharov (1761–1811), Russian architect
Andrey Zakharov, Russian journalist
Artem Zakharov (footballer) (born 1996), Ukrainian footballer
Fyodor Zakharov (1919–1994), Russian and Ukrainian painter
Gennadi Zakharov, Soviet physicist and spy
Georgiy Zakharov (1897–1957), Soviet military leader and army general
Halyna Zakharova (born 1947), Soviet handball player
Ivan Zakharov (1816–1885), Russian Sinologist
Konstantin Zakharov (born 1985), Belarusian ice hockey player
Konstantin Zakharov (politician) (born 1973), Russian politician
Maria Zakharova, (born 1975), Russian diplomat and journalist
Mark Zakharov (1933–2019), Russian film and theatre director and playwright
Matvei Zakharov (1898–1972), Soviet military leader
Mikhail Zakharov (Soviet Navy officer) (1912–1978), Soviet naval officer
Nadezhda Zakharova (born 1945), Soviet basketball player
Natalya Zakharova (born 1945), Russian rowing coxswain 
Olive Zakharov (1929–1995), Australian politician
Pyotr Zakharov-Chechenets (1816–1846), Russian painter of Chechen origin
Rostislav Zakharov (1907–1984), Soviet choreographer and People's Artist of the USSR
Sergei Zakharov (disambiguation), multiple people
Stella Zakharova (born 1963), Soviet gymnast
Svetlana Zakharova (athlete) (born 1970), Russian runner
Svetlana Zakharova (dancer) (born 1979), Russian dancer
Tatjana Michaylovna Zacharova (born 1931), Russian production worker, author and politician
Tetiana Zakharova-Nadyrova (born 1951), Soviet basketball player
Vadim Petrovich Zakharov (born 1975), Russian scientist-chemist
Vasily Zakharov (born 1934), Soviet minister of culture
Vladimir E. Zakharov (born 1939), Russian theoretical physicist
Vladimir Ivanovich Zakharov (born 1961), Belarusian guitarist, composer and music teacher
Vladimir Grigoryevich Zakharov (1901–1956), Soviet composer
Vladimir Mikhailovich Zakharov (1946–2013) Russian choreographer, dancer and academician
Yevgen Zakharov (born 1952), Ukrainian human rights activist
Yury Zakharov (born 1938), Russian chemist and former rector of Rector of Kemerovo State University

Fictional characters
Prokhor Zakharov, fictional character profile from the video game Sid Meier's Alpha Centauri

See also
Zakharov (rural locality) (Zakharova), several rural localities in Russia
Zakharovo, several rural localities in Russia
Zakharovite, a mineral
Sakharov, Russian surname
Zakharov v. Russia, 2015 European Court for Human Rights ruling on surveillance legislation

Russian-language surnames
Surnames from given names